Mehmandust-e Olya (also Romanized as Mehmāndūst-e ‘Olyā; also known as Mehmāndūst-e Bālā and Mīhmāndūst-e Bālā) is a village in Mehmandust Rural District, Kuraim District, Nir County, Ardabil Province, Iran. At the 2006 census, its population was 375, in 75 families.

References 

Towns and villages in Nir County